Pavel Markovich Polian, pseudonym: Pavel Nerler (born 31 August 1952) is a Russian geographer and historian, and Doctor of Geographical Sciences with the Institute of Geography (1998) of the Russian Academy of Sciences. He authored over 300 publications and is most known for his research on the history and geography of forced migrations.

Polian is director of the Mandelshtam Center at the National Research University Higher School of Economics.

Brief bibliography
 "Жертвы двух диктатур. Остарбайтеры и военнопленные в Третьем Рейхе и их репатриация. – М.: Ваш выбор ЦИРЗ, 1996. – 442 pp. (Victims of Two Dictatorships. Ostarbeiters and POW in Third Reich and Their Repatriation) 
 Westarbeiters. Interned Germans in the USSR (Prehistory, History, Geography). – "Вестарбайтеры". Интернированные немцы в СССР (предыстория, история, география) / Учебное пособие для спецкурса. Ставрополь—Москва: Изд-во СГУ, 1999. 48 pp; Вестарбайтеры. Интернированные немцы на советских стройках // Родина. 1999. No. 9. pp. 21–25;  (the title is a pun with "Ostarbeiter")
 
 English translation: 
Свитки из пепла. Еврейская “зондеркоммандо” в Аушвице-Биркенау и ее летописцы (Scrolls from the Ashes. Jewish "Sonderkommando" at Auschwitz-Birkenau and its Chroniclers), 2014
Сталинские депортации, 1928–1953 
Обреченные погибнуть. Судьба советских военнопленных-евреев во Второй мировой войне. Воспоминания и документы
Отрицание отрицания, или Битва под Аушвицем: дебаты о демографии и геополитике холокоста

References

Russian geographers
Living people
Russian Jews
Russian sociologists
20th-century Russian historians
1952 births
Historical geographers
Moscow State University alumni
21st-century Russian historians